Charli Jacoby (born 9 Oct 1989) is an American rugby union player. She plays Prop for the United States internationally and for Exeter Chiefs in the Premier 15s.

Rugby career 
Jacoby made her international debut for the United States against England in June 2019.

Jacoby moved to England in September 2021 to play for Loughborough Lightning and made 20 appearances for them. In November 2021, She was named in the starting line-up in the first match against Canada at the 2021 Pacific Four Series.

Jacoby featured for the USA Falcons against the Wales XV's team in March 2022. Her side made a second-half comeback to win 31–23  in Wales Six Nations warm-up. After the 2021–22 Premier 15s season, Jacoby joined Exeter Chiefs and is due to make her debut after the World Cup.

Jacoby came off the bench in the Eagles 52–14 loss to England in a warm-up match before the World Cup. She was selected in the Eagles squad for the delayed 2021 Rugby World Cup in New Zealand.

References

External links
Eagles Profile

Living people
1989 births
Female rugby union players
American female rugby union players
United States women's international rugby union players